Putim is a municipality and village in Písek District in the South Bohemian Region of the Czech Republic. It has about 500 inhabitants. The village centre is well preserved and is protected by law as a village monument zone.

Geography
It lies in the České Budějovice Basin. The village is situated on the right bank of the Blanice River, on the shore of the Podkostelní Pond.

History
Historically the spot was inhabited sporadically first by Celtic tribes (2nd century BCE), then by Romans (1st century) and then subsequently by old Slavs during the 8th century. Since the 11th century the area of the settlement has been permanently occupied. The first written mention of Putim is from 1205 in a document, which mentions an older document probably from 1148–1158. In the 13th century Putim became a property of the town of Písek.

Sights

The Church of Saint Lawrence is an early Gothic building from the second half of the 13th century. There are several valuable houses built in the folk baroque style.

In literature
In one chapter of the novel The Good Soldier Švejk the author describes how Švejk in Putim meets up with a local gendarmerie officer, who is constantly drunk and who mistakes Švejk for a Russian spy. The first statue of Švejk in the Czech Republic was unveiled in Putim in August 2014.

Putim was also nationwide popularized by the novel of Jindřich Šimon Baar Jan Cimbura.

References

External links

Villages in Písek District